Beth Allen (born December 6, 1981) is an American professional golfer who plays on the Ladies European Tour (LET).

Allen played on the LPGA Tour from 2005 to 2008 after finishing tied for 25th at the LPGA Final Qualifying Tournament.

Allen qualified for the Ladies European Tour for the 2009 season. She won her first LET event at the 2015 ISPS Handa Ladies European Masters with former European Solheim Cup winner Sophie Gustafson on her bag.

In March 2011, Allen donated a kidney to her brother who had been suffering with a kidney disorder for 12 years. She returned to compete on the tour just two months later, in May.

Allen won the 2016 Ladies European Tour Order of Merit and the Player of the Year award. She also regained an LPGA Tour card for 2017 via the LPGA Final Qualifying Tournament.

Professional wins

Ladies European Tour wins
2015 ISPS Handa Ladies European Masters
2016 Lacoste Ladies Open de France, Fatima Bint Mubarak Ladies Open

ALPG Tour wins
2015 Pennant Hills ALPG Pro-Am

References

External links

American female golfers
LPGA Tour golfers
Ladies European Tour golfers
People from Ojai, California
Golfers from San Diego
Sportspeople from Ventura County, California
1981 births
Living people
21st-century American women